Tarryn Davey (born 29 February 1996) is a New Zealand field hockey player for the New Zealand national team.

She participated at the 2018 Women's Hockey World Cup.

References

1996 births
Living people
New Zealand female field hockey players
Female field hockey defenders
People from Morrinsville
Field hockey players at the 2020 Summer Olympics
Olympic field hockey players of New Zealand
Commonwealth Games gold medallists for New Zealand
Commonwealth Games medallists in field hockey
Field hockey players at the 2018 Commonwealth Games
Field hockey players at the 2022 Commonwealth Games
20th-century New Zealand women
21st-century New Zealand women
Sportspeople from Waikato
Medallists at the 2018 Commonwealth Games